Likoma Airport  is an airport on Likoma Island, Republic of Malawi. The island lies in Lake Malawi a few kilometres off the shore of Mozambique.

Airlines and destinations

Passenger

See also
Transport in Malawi
List of airports in Malawi

References

 Google Earth

External links
 OurAirports - Likoma
 Likoma Airport

Airports in Malawi
Buildings and structures in Northern Region, Malawi